Zhing-zhong is a Zimbabwean slang word meaning low cost Asian (mostly Chinese) consumer products of poor quality. 

The word gained traction in Zimbabwe during the 2000s when an influx of Chinese merchants and storekeepers imported consumer products into Zimbabwe. 

The term carries strong connotations of widespread discontent over the continued de-industrialisation of Zimbabwe, and the replacement of its products with Chinese ones. In some quarters, "zhing-zhong" or simply "zhing" is a slur for the Chinese. Perhaps mindful of this, the Government of Zimbabwe is reported to have banned the word. The word "zhing-zhong", according to Thulani Chikanda, refers to products from China even if they are of high quality, it is not about being cheap but about the origin. Chikanda also argues that this word was merely a petition to the government to tell China to improve quality on products.

"Zhing-zhong" is a synonym to the South African word "Fon-kong".

Ironically, the original Chinese word (精装) means "deluxe" and is often used in Chinese advertisements.

See also
China–Zimbabwe relations
Ching chong
Shanzhai

References

China–Zimbabwe relations
Zimbabwean culture
Pejorative terms related to technology
2000s slang